A parliamentary secretary is a member of Parliament in the Westminster system who assists a more senior minister with their duties. In several countries, the position has been re-designated as assistant minister.

In the parliamentary systems of several Commonwealth countries, such as the United Kingdom, Canada, Australia, India and Singapore, it is customary for the prime minister to appoint parliamentary secretaries from their political party in parliament to assist cabinet ministers with their work. The role of parliamentary secretaries varies under different prime ministers. The post has often served as a training ground for future ministers.

In the Commonwealth

Australia 
In Australia, parliamentary secretaries are appointed in the federal government and most state governments. At the federal level, the Australian constitution provides only for the appointment of "ministers of state". Under current practice, ministers of state are divided into three levels: parliamentary secretaries are the third level, after cabinet ministers (ministers who are members of the Cabinet of Australia) and other ministers. Since 2015, "parliamentary secretaries" have been known as "assistant ministers" instead. However, the Ministers of State Act 1952 still refers to "parliamentary secretaries", as a category of "ministers of state". The Prime Minister is permitted to appoint a member from either house of Parliament to be a parliamentary secretary to a minister. As they are ministers of state for constitutional purposes, parliamentary secretaries may be paid a salary.

According to Paul Keating in 1993, "the institution of Parliamentary Secretary provides a very inexpensive means not only of giving talented individuals executive experience but providing Ministers with needed support."

In the state of Queensland, parliamentary secretaries were re-designated as 'assistant ministers' following the 2012 Queensland election.

Canada

During Jean Chrétien's term as Prime Minister of Canada, parliamentary secretaries were set to two-year terms and the post was used as a reward for weary backbenchers. Their duty was to answer questions and table reports on behalf of ministers when they were unable to be present in the house.

Chrétien's successor as Canadian Prime Minister, Paul Martin, when sworn in in 2003, promised a new role for parliamentary secretaries.  They would now be sworn into the privy council, giving them access to some secret documents, and allowing them to attend Canadian Cabinet meetings and be assigned specific files by ministers.  This replaced the positions of Secretaries of State which had been employed under Chrétien.

Ceylon
Under the Soulbury Constitution, junior members of parliament were appointed to serve as parliamentary secretaries. Each cabinet minister would have one parliamentary secretary. In 1972, the republican constitution replace the position of parliamentary secretary with that of deputy minister. With the parliamentary secretary for external affairs and defence serving as the de facto parliamentary secretary to the Prime Minister of Ceylon.

Malaysia

New Zealand 
The position titled Parliamentary Under-Secretary is established by the Constitution Act 1986. Unlike ministers in the New Zealand Government, parliamentary under-secretaries are not members of the Executive Council.

New Zealand also has Parliamentary Private Secretaries.

Singapore

United Kingdom 
In the United Kingdom, Parliamentary Secretary (in full, usually Parliamentary Under-Secretary of State in those departments headed by a Secretary of State) is the third level of government minister, below Minister of State and Secretary of State (or another minister of Secretary of State rank, such as the Chancellor of the Exchequer). Not all departments have all three levels of minister.

A Parliamentary Private Secretary (PPS), on the other hand, is a Member of Parliament who acts as an unpaid assistant to an individual minister, but has no ministerial role, although is expected to support the government at all times.

Outside the Commonwealth

Germany 

A Parliamentary State Secretary is a member of the Bundestag given a portfolio to assist a Minister with running a government ministry. The position is roughly analogous to deputy ministers.

In 2021, there are 36 parliamentary state secretaries in the Merkel IV Cabinet. The position was first introduced in 1967 to help younger politicians gain experience for future ministerial roles.

Ireland
In the Irish Free State, the Ministers and Secretaries Act, 1924 created the post of Parliamentary Secretary, originally limited to seven holders. In 1978, the office was superseded in Ireland by the office of Minister of State.

See also 

 Parliamentary assistant
Permanent secretary
Private secretary
Undersecretary

References

 

Political terminology in Australia
Political terminology in Canada
Government in Canada